Emyr Evans (born 25 November 1996) is a Welsh male squash player. His highest career ranking was 84 in March 2023.

References 

1996 births
Living people
Welsh male squash players
Sportspeople from Cardiff